Billow Kerrow (born 1958, Rhamu) is a Kenyan politician from Mandera County. He served as a Member of Parliament for Mandera Central constituency from 2002 - 2007 and as the first Senator of Mandera county from 2013 - 2017. Billow Kerrow also served as KANU's shadow finance minister in the ninth parliament. He also served as the Chairperson of Standing Committee on Finance, Commerce and Budget in the Senate. In February 2016,  Sen. Billow Kerrow replaced Sen. Kipchumba Murkomen as a Member of the Pan-African Parliament. In 2017, Billow Kerrow decided to quit politics after 15 years saying it is "an appropriate time to re-evaluate and move on".

References

External links
Mandera County Government

Living people
Place of birth missing (living people)
1958 births
Members of the Senate of Kenya
Members of the National Assembly (Kenya)
21st-century Kenyan politicians
Members of the 12th Parliament of Kenya